Bernardis is a surname. Notable people with the surname include:

 Robert Bernardis (1908–1944), Austrian resistance fighter 
 Stéphane Bernardis (born 1974), French pair skater

See also
 Edoardo De Bernardis (born 1978), Italian figure skating coach and choreographer